Juliana Chen is a Chinese magician, who was born in the Hunan province of China. She has appeared on the cover of The Linking Ring, published by the International Brotherhood of Magicians.

Early life
Chen was born Chen Zhi Ling in the Hunan provenance of China. At the age of 10 she was chosen to train at the Hunan Academy for the Performing Arts in the fields of ballet, juggling, and acrobatics. During a hospital stay for repeated leg injuries Chen witnessed a television performance by Shimada, prompting her interest in learning to perform magic. Chen would later immigrate to Canada in the hopes of achieving success outside of China.

References

Further reading
"Vancouver magician turns dream into reality" from The Record
"People: A belief in magic" from Maclean's
"Queen of the inexplicable: Though she's practically the invisible woman in Vancouver, Juliana Chen may be the greatest magician in the world" from The Vancouver Sun
"Magician's success no trick: Performer has travelled a long way from her native China to become a leading master of manipulation" from The Province
"Chinese immigrant rediscovers love for magic tricks" from The StarPhoenix
"Now you see her" from The Globe and Mail

Living people
People from Hunan
Canadian magicians
Year of birth missing (living people)